HMS Limbourne (L57) was a  escort destroyer, operated by the Royal Navy. She was sunk in action, off German-occupied Guernsey, on 23 October 1943.

Design
Limbourne was one of seven Type III Hunt-class destroyers ordered for the Royal Navy on 4 July 1940, as part of the 1940 War Emergency Programme. The Hunt class was meant to fill the Royal Navy's need for a large number of small destroyer-type vessels capable of both convoy escort and operations with the fleet. The Type III Hunts differed from the previous Type II ships in replacing a twin 4-inch gun mount by two torpedo tubes to improve their ability to operate as destroyers.

Displacement was  standard and  under full load.

Main gun armament was four 4 inch (102 mm) QF Mk XVI dual purpose (anti-ship and anti-aircraft) guns in two twin mounts, with a quadruple 2-pounder "pom-pom" and three Oerlikon 20 mm cannon providing close-in anti-aircraft fire. Two  torpedo tubes were fitted in a single twin mount, while two depth charge chutes, four depth charge throwers and 70 depth charges 
comprised the ship's anti-submarine armament. Type 291 and Type 285 radars were fitted, as was Type 128 sonar.

Construction and service
Limbourne was laid down at Alexander Stephen and Sons' shipyard at Linthouse, Glasgow on 8 April 1941. She was launched on 12 May 1942, and was completed on 24 October 1942.

After commissioning, Limbourne spent November in sea trials and work up with the Home Fleet at Scapa Flow, interrupting work up to escort the battleship  out to Gibraltar and the aircraft carrier  and battleship  back to the UK from the Mediterranean Sea following the Anglo-American landings in North Africa. After completing workup, she joined the 15th Destroyer Flotilla based at Devonport.

In January and February 1943 Limbourne escorted convoys between the UK and Gibraltar, while in March, the ship was under repair at Portsmouth, with a propeller being replaced. Following the completion of these repairs, Limbourne was deployed on escort and anti-submarine patrol duties in the Western Approaches and the Bay of Biscay, together with operations against German convoys in the English Channel. In the resulting exchange of fire, Limbourne was hit by a German shell and sustained slight damage.

Loss

On 23 October Limbourne was sailing with the light cruiser  and five other destroyers, when they were engaged by a number of large German Type 39 torpedo boats. Both ships were hit by torpedoes.  scored a hit on Limbourne exploding the forward magazine. 40 crewmembers of Limbourne were killed. Attempts were made to tow her back to port, for repairs. The tow attempts had to be abandoned, and she was scuttled.

In 2011 the BBC News reported that "The incident was used as an illustration of what not to do by the Royal Navy tactical school." They reported that the Royal Navy ships were sunk by a smaller but better trained German force.

Notes

References

Further reading

Hunt-class destroyers of the Royal Navy
Scuttled vessels
World War II shipwrecks in the English Channel
Maritime incidents in October 1943
1942 ships
Naval magazine explosions